Roman Luknár (born 1 June 1965) is a Slovak actor. He appeared in more than fifty films since 1988.

Selected filmography

References

External links 

1965 births
Living people
Actors from Bratislava
Slovak male film actors